ROKS Bucheon (PCC-773) was a  of the Republic of Korea Navy.

Development and design 

The Pohang class is a series of corvettes built by different Korean shipbuilding companies. The class consists of 24 ships and some after decommissioning were sold or given to other countries. There are five different types of designs in the class from Flight II to Flight VI.

Construction and career 
Bucheon was launched on 30 December 1988 by Hyundai Heavy Industries in Ulsan. The vessel was commissioned in 1990.

On 22 December 2016,  and ROKS Bucheon conducted an officer exchange program.

On 25 March 2021, was decommissioned at Jinhae military port.

Gallery

References
 

Ships built by Hyundai Heavy Industries Group
Pohang-class corvettes
1988 ships